Per is a Scandinavian masculine given name. It is derived from Greek , Petros (an invented, masculine form of Greek petra, the word for "rock" or "stone"). The name is a variant of Peter, a common masculine name of the same origin. Other Scandinavian variants of Per are Pehr, Peer and Pär.

A–B
 Per Aabel (1902–1999), Norwegian comic actor
 Per Almar Aas (1929–2014), Norwegian politician
 Per Ahlmark (1939–2018), Swedish writer and former politician
 Per Egil Ahlsen (born 1958), retired Norwegian footballer
 Per Aldeheim (born 1966), Swedish guitarist, songwriter, and producer
 Per Almaas (1898–1991), Norwegian politician
 Per Almqvist (born 1978), Swedish singer-songwriter
 Per Andersen (1930–2020), Norwegian brain researcher
 Per Anger (1913–2002), Swedish diplomat
 Per Ankersjö (born 1971), Swedish politician
 Per Ankre (born 1948), Norwegian handball player
 Per Arneberg (1901–1981), Norwegian poet and translator
 Per Arnoldi (born 1941), Danish artist
 Per Asplin (1928–1996), Norwegian singer, composer, and actor
 Per Daniel Amadeus Atterbom (1790–1855), Swedish poet
 Per Aunet (born 1940), Norwegian politician and former athlete
 Per Bak (1948–2002), Danish theoretical physicist
 Per Bakken (1882–1958), Norwegian Nordic skier
 Per Bang (1922–2010), Norwegian journalist
 Per Bauhn (born 1960), Swedish philosopher and author
 Per Bengtsson (born 1967), Swedish speedskater
 Per Aage Brandt (1944–2021), Danish writer, poet, and linguist
 Per Bergersen (1960–1990), Swedish musician and songwriter
 Per Bergerud (born 1956), Norwegian ski jumper
 Per Bergman (1886–1950), Swedish competitive sailor
 Per Bergsland (1918–1992), Norwegian pilot, prisoner of war, and escapee from Stalag Luft III
 Per Bertilsson (1892–1972), Swedish gymnast
 Per Bill (born 1958), Swedish politician
 Per Bjerregaard (born 1946), executive director of Danish football club Brøndby IF
 Per Bjørang (born 1948), Norwegian speed skater
 Per Blom (canoeist) (born 1949), Norwegian sprint canoer
 Per Blom (director) (1946–2013), Norwegian film director
 Per Borten (1913–2005), Prime Minister of Norway, 1965–1971
 Per Brahe the Elder (1520–1590), Swedish statesman
 Per Brahe the Younger (1602–1680), Swedish soldier and statesman
 Per Brandtzæg (1936–2016), Norwegian physician and professor
 Per Bratland (1907–1988), Norwegian newspaper editor and author
 Per Bredesen (1930–2022), Norwegian footballer
 Per Brinch Hansen (1938–2007), Danish-American computer scientist and pioneer of concurrent programming
 Per Brogeland (born 1953), Norwegian football coach
 Per Bronken (1935–2002), Norwegian poet, novelist, actor, and stage producer
 Per Brunvand (1937–2015), Norwegian newspaper editor
 Per Buckhøj (1902–1964), Danish film actor
 Per Bäckman (born 1950), Swedish ice hockey player

C–J
 Per Carlén (born 1960), Swedish handball player
 Per Carleson (1917–2004), Swedish officer and fencer
 Per Carlqvist (born 1938), Swedish plasma physicist
 Per Carlsen (diplomat) (1948–2020), Swedish diplomat
 Per Carlsén (born 1960), Swedish curler
 Per Cederblom (1901–1987), Swedish breaststroke swimmer
 Per Christensen (1934–2009), Norwegian actor
 Per Eberhard Cogell (1734–1812), Swedish artist
 Per Collinder (1890–1974), Swedish astronomer
 Per Dalin (1936–2010), Norwegian educationalist
 Per Ditlev-Simonsen (born 1932), Norwegian politician and former mayor of Oslo
 Per Drageset (born 1944), Norwegian civil servant
 Per Eggers (born 1951), Swedish actor 
 Per Egil Flo (born 1989), Norwegian footballer
 Per Erik Granström (1942–2011), Swedish politician
 Per Egil Hegge (born 1940), Norwegian journalist
 Per Einarsson (born 1984), Swedish bandy player
 Per Enflo (born 1944), Swedish mathematician and concert pianist
 Per Gedda (1914–2005), Swedish sailor
 Per Gessle (born 1959), Swedish musician, member of Roxette
 Per Günther (born 1988), German basketball player
 Per-Arne Håkansson (born 1963), Swedish politician
 Per Albin Hansson (1885–1946), Swedish politician
 Per Husted (born 1966), Danish politician

K–Z
 Per Kellin (1903–1973), Swedish Army major general
 Per Krøldrup (born 1979), retired Danish footballer
 Per Kirkeby (1938–2018), Danish artist
 Per Botolf Maurseth (born 1969), Norwegian economist and politician
 Per Mertesacker (born 1984), retired German footballer
 Per Edmund Mordt (born 1965), retired Norwegian footballer
 Per Nørgård (born 1932), Danish writer and composer
 Per Yngve Ohlin (1969–1991), Swedish singer 
 Per Welinder (born 1962), Swedish professional skateboarder
 Per Martin-Löf (born 1942), Swedish logician, philosopher, and mathematical statistician
 Per T. Ohlsson (1958–2022), Swedish journalist
 Erik Per Sullivan (born 1991), American-Swedish actor

See also 
Pär
Pehr
Peter
 

Scandinavian masculine given names
Danish masculine given names
Norwegian masculine given names
Swedish masculine given names

de:Per